Silent Circle is a German Eurodisco band formed in West Germany in 1985. The band consists of vocalist Martin Tychsen (Jo Jo Tyson), keyboardist & composer Axel Breitung, and drummer Jürgen Behrens (CC Behrens).

History 

Silent Circle first performed in 1979 but soon parted ways. In the early '80s, the trio reformed and decided to form a more solid group. Hence, that marked the beginning of Silent Circle. Their first single, "Hide Away - Man is Comin'!", gained considerable limelight followed by a number of other successful singles like "Touch in the Night", "Stop the Rain", "Love is Just a Word" and "Time for Love". In 1986, they released their first album No. 1, consisting of 11 songs. The album was launched under the Blow-Up label of Intercord Company. Meanwhile, Harald Shaefer replaced Axel Breitung for public performances, and the band's founder and leader then devoted himself totally to writing and producing new songs.

In 1987, 2 singles were released on Teldec, "Danger Danger" and "Oh, Don't Lose Your Heart Tonight". In 1990, another album was released by Silent Circle, containing 10 songs, two being from 1987 and two being remixes. In 1993, a compilation entitled Best Of Silent Circle was released and contained only remixed and other versions of their old songs. In 1994, a new album was released entitled Back, containing 12 new songs. In 1998, they released another album entitled Stories 'bout Love containing 12 new songs.

Discography

Albums 

 No. 1 (1986)
 Back (1994)
 Stories 'bout Love (1998)
 Chapter Euro Dance (2018)
 Chapter 80ies - Unreleased (2018)
 Chapter Italo Dance - Unreleased (2018)

Singles 

 "Hide Away – Man Is Comin'!" (1985)
 "Touch in the Night" (1985)
 "Stop the Rain" / "Shy Girl" (1986)
 "Love Is Just a Word" (1986)
 "Time for Love" (1986)
 "Danger Danger" (1987)
 "Oh, Don't Lose Your Heart Tonight" (1987)
 "Moonlight Affair" (1987)
 "I Am Your Believer" (1989)
 "What a Shame" (1989)
 "2night" (1993)
 "Every Move, Every Touch" (1994)
 "Egyptian Eyes" (promo only) (1996)
 "Touch in the Night '98" (1998)
 "One More Night" (1998)
 "Night Train" (1999)
 "I Need a Woman" (2000)
 "Moonlight Affair 2001" (feat. MMX) (2001)
 "2 Night" (2018)
 "Every Move Every Touch" (2018)

Compilation albums 

 Best of Silent Circle (1993, Dusty Records)
 Back II (1997, Dusty Records)
 Touch in the Night (limited edition) (1998, VMP International)
 Their Greatest Hits of the 90's (2000, AWP Records)
 Turbo Disco (2002, Фирма Грамзаписи Никитин) 
 Deluxe Collection - The best of Silent Circle (2005)
 Silent Circle & Italio Disco Stars - Hits & More Mix (2007, Eurodisco Production) 
 The best (2010, Танцевальный Рай) 
 25 Years - The Anniversary Album (2010, Spectre Media)
 Hits & More (2010, Hargent Media)
 The Original Maxi-Singles Collection (2014, Pokorny Music Solutions)
 Touch in the night - Hits & more (2015, Hargent Media)
 My star (2020, DA Records)
 Stories - The remix album (2020)
 Luxury (2021)
 Lost in space - Dekuxe edition (2021) 
    Zeitlos-Silent Circle [CD] (2022. december 2.MORE Music & Media GmbH & Co. KG)

References

External links 

 
 

Ariola Records artists
Eurodisco groups
German dance music groups
German synthpop groups
Musical groups established in 1985
1985 establishments in West Germany